A mangrove is a shrub or tree that grows in coastal saline or brackish water.

Mangrove may also refer to:

USLHT Mangrove,  lighthouse tender ship
The Mangrove, former Caribbean restaurant in Notting Hill, west London
Mangrove (film), 2020 historical drama film directed by Steve McQueen